MG4 is a 2000 album by Japanese musician, DJ, record producer and composer Mondo Grosso.

Track listing
 "MG2SS" - 7:45
 "Into the Wind" - 0:42
 "Butterfly" - 6:03
 "Show Me Your Love - 5:33
 "Into the sound" - 0:23
 "Life" - 7:08
 "MG4BB" - 5:37
 "SCENARIO" - 6:08
 "Into the Seawind" - 1:06
 "Samba Do Gato" - 7:37
 "Now You Know Better " - 5:32
 "STAR SUITE I: New Star" - 3:17
 "STAR SUITE II: Fading Star" - 4:10
 "STAR SUITE III: North Star" - 7:19
 "1974 - Way Home-" - 4:37

2000 albums
Shinichi Osawa albums